A Hidden Life may refer to:
 A Hidden Life (memoir), a memoir by Johanna Reiss
 A Hidden Life (2001 film), a Brazilian drama film
 A Hidden Life (2019 film), a historical drama film directed by Terrence Malick